The 1951 World Table Tennis Championships women's singles was the 18th edition of the women's singles championship.
Angelica Rozeanu defeated Gizi Farkas in the final by three sets to nil, to win the title.

Results

+ Time limit rule applied

See also
List of World Table Tennis Championships medalists

References

-
1951 in women's table tennis